Sant Feliu (Catalan from Saint Felix) may refer to:

Sant Feliu de Buixalleu, village in the province of Girona
Sant Feliu de Codines, municipality in the comarca of the Vallès Oriental
Sant Feliu de Guíxols, municipality in the comarca of the Baix Empordà
Sant Feliu de Llobregat, capital of the comarca of Baix Llobregat
Sant Feliu de Pallerols, village in the province of Girona
Sant Feliu Sasserra, municipality in the comarca of Bages